Teso sub-region (previously known as Teso District) is a sub-region in Eastern Region, Uganda that consists of:

 Amuria District
 Bukedea District
 Kaberamaido District
 Kapelebyong District
 Katakwi District
 Kumi District
 Ngora District
 Serere District
 Soroti District

The sub-region covers an area of 13,030.6 km and is home to an estimated 2.5 million people of Iteso and Kumam ethnicity.

Politically, Pallisa District does not belong to Teso Sub-region although Iteso tribes populate larger parts of this district.

References

The Iteso tribes have extended to occupy parts of Tororo district in Uganda and across to the neighbouring country of Kenya in the East.  

Sub-regions of Uganda